Kidstuff is a Canadian children's television series produced by CTV and Champlain Productions, in 1975 and 1976.

Premise

The series provided a combination of entertainment and education for children between eight and 12 years old.  It had a cast of 4 children (Harry Coates, Cathy Cornell, Suzin Schiff, and Doug Springall) and 4 adults (Maryann B. Joffe,  Wally Martin, Susan Mainzer, and Les Nirenberg) as various goofy characters the kids interacted with. Later the character Mr. Magic was introduced into the show played by real magician Ian Snow Carpenter.

It made extensive use of chromakey technology, to depict the cast as miniaturized on a set consisting of toys, games, and candy. It also used Robotoons, a "live-cartoon" technology, similar to Aniforms, created by the show's set designer, Don Keller. Choreography was by Big Time Productions.

The show was written by Bill Hartley, with Janis Nostbakken as Educational Advisor.

Cliff Jones and Bill Hartley composed the music for the series. Vocal Direction was by Phil Pitre. A soundtrack album was released by Rising Records (RILP-101).

Costumes were by Juul Haalmeyer, who would later be best known for costuming The David Steinberg Show, SCTV and CODCO.

Production
Kidstuff was produced in Montreal at CFCF-TV and premiered on CTV for its 1975-76 season. 26 episodes were produced over two seasons and rebroadcast for several more years thereafter. The first season of 17 episodes was produced for approximately $400 000.

The series premiered 27 September 1975, in the 10 a.m. Eastern time slot. The debut episode was recorded on 27 February 1975. The series attracted a national rating of 425 000 viewers.

Awards and recognition
 1976: New York Festivals - International Film and Television Awards - gold medal
 1976: ACTRA Award

References

External links
 
 KidStuff Closing Credits
 Kidstuff pilot episode (Feb. 27, 1975)

CTV Television Network original programming
1970s Canadian children's television series
1975 Canadian television series debuts
1976 Canadian television series endings
Canadian children's education television series
Television series about children